A flexor is a muscle that flexes a joint. In anatomy, flexion (from the Latin verb flectere, to bend) is a joint movement that decreases the angle between the bones that converge at the joint. For example, one’s elbow joint flexes when one brings their hand closer to the shoulder. Flexion is typically instigated by muscle contraction of a flexor.

Flexors

Upper limb

of the humerus bone (the bone in the upper arm) at the shoulder
Pectoralis major
Anterior deltoid
Coracobrachialis
Biceps brachii
 of the forearm at the elbow
Brachialis
Brachioradialis
Biceps brachii
of carpus (the carpal bones) at the wrist
flexor carpi radialis
flexor carpi ulnaris
palmaris longus
of the hand
flexor pollicis longus muscle
flexor pollicis brevis muscle
flexor digitorum profundus muscle
flexor digitorum superficialis muscle

Lower limb

Hip

The hip flexors are (in descending order of importance to the action of flexing the hip joint):

Collectively known as the iliopsoas or inner hip muscles:
 Psoas major
 Iliacus muscle
Anterior compartment of thigh
 Rectus femoris (part of the quadriceps muscle group)
 Sartorius
 One of the gluteal muscles:
 Tensor fasciae latae
 Medial compartment of thigh
 Pectineus
 Adductor longus
 Adductor brevis
 Gracilis

Without the iliopsoas muscles, flexion in sitting position is not possible across the horizontal plane.

Thigh
 of thigh at knee (L5-S2)
Biceps femoris
Semitendinosus
Semimembranosus
Gracilis
Sartorius
Gastrocnemius
Popliteus
Plantaris (negligible)

 of toes
 Posterior compartment of leg
 Flexor hallucis longus
 Flexor digitorum longus
 Flexor digitorum brevis
 Quadratus plantae
 Flexor hallucis brevis
 Flexor digiti minimi brevis
 of proximal phalanges at metatarsophalangeal joint
 Lumbrical muscle (foot)
 Plantar interossei
 Dorsal interossei

Other
 torso/lumbar vertebrae
 Rectus abdominis muscle
 neck at atlanto-occipital joint
 Longus capitis muscle
 Longus colli muscle

See also

List of extensors of the human body

References

Anatomical terms of motion